WNKS (95.1 FM, "Kiss 95.1") is a commercial FM radio station licensed to serve Charlotte, North Carolina. The station is owned by Beasley Broadcast Group through licensee Beasley Media Group, LLC and broadcasts a top 40 (CHR) format.

History

WIST-FM, WRNA and WROQ
95.1 signed on in 1962 as WIST-FM with a beautiful music format, and was co-owned with WIST (1240 AM). In just a few years, WIST-FM flipped to oldies, one of the first FM stations to ever try the format. SIS Radio, owners of 61 Big WAYS (610 AM), bought WIST-FM in 1972. That year, WIST-FM changed to progressive rock with the new letters WRNA. Calvin Walker was "the torchbearer for progressive rock and album cuts on WRNA-FM", according to Charlie Hanna of The Charlotte Observer. 

Sis Broadcasting bought WRNA-FM, which was number 10 in the market, and switched it to WROQ with a format of "adult rock". People complained that WROQ did not play "harder" rock like WRNA, instead playing a mix of Top 40 and "more esoteric numbers". Among those who apparently did not like the change was operations manager Walker, who left for WRPL in April 1973. However, WROQ went to number five "on a cumulative basis" in the metro ratings after four months. Progressive rock on WROQ was limited to simulcasts of In Concert on ABC on some Friday nights and a Saturday program.

WROQ went by the moniker "95Q". Among the WROQ/WAYS DJs to become major celebrities were Robert Murphy (who went to greater fame in Chicago), and actor Jay Thomas, who went to KPWR in Los Angeles as the host of The Power 106 Morning Zoo. Larry Sprinkle, a WCNC-TV morning weather personality, also worked at the stations. The stations would simulcast in morning drive, while running separate programming the rest of the day. The progressive rock format would evolve into album-oriented rock in the early 1980s.

First Top 40 era
With album rock declining in popularity, WROQ became a CHR station called "Q95" in August 1984. By the late 1980s, WROQ evolved into a Rock-leaning Top 40 format,  better known as "Rock 40".  Its AM sister station would simulcast WROQ during morning and afternoon drive-times during this time period, though it would flip to oldies in 1986. Also in 1986, SIS Radio would sell the two stations to CRB Broadcasting, who would then sell the stations again, first to Adams Radio in 1988, then to Tenore Broadcasting the following year.

On January 19, 1990, at 3 p.m., after stunting with a 19-hour loop of "Shock the Monkey" by Peter Gabriel (which even prompted a call to local police services, thinking the station was being taken hostage), the station returned to CHR as WZZG, "Gorilla Radio, The New Z95.1 FM", which was partially inspired by the success of "Pirate Radio" in Los Angeles. By the end of the station's run, the station had a dayparted format of Top 40 during the day and more heavy metal in the evenings. In addition, the station would drop the "Gorilla Radio" portion of the moniker to just be named "Z95.1".

Flip to oldies; second Top 40 era
The return to CHR didn't last long; Adams Radio would buy the station back in late 1990. On December 26 of that year, after playing "Free Bird" by Lynyrd Skynyrd, WZZG became WGKL-FM, "Kool 95.1", an oldies format emphasizing 50s music more than Magic 96.1, utilizing Satellite Music Network's "Pure Gold" format. The flip occurred because of a company-wide initiative where most of Adams' stations flipped to the format. This format, however, would last just a short time. After a few months, the station added a local airstaff, but by the station's end, the entire staff was let go and the station went completely automated again. The flip to oldies would also bankrupt the entire company, resulting in their stations being placed in receivership and being sold off one by one.

On October 3, 1991, WGKL began stunting with a different format each day, using other formats from Satellite Music Networks (including Real Country, Stardust, Z-Rock, and Starstation), a simulcast of WCNT, all comedy, and Hot AC, with listeners being allowed to vote on the new format. However, at Noon on October 14, the announced result was "None of the above." The station then returned to CHR as WAQQ, "95 Double Q", which started with a "25,000 Songs in a Row, Commercial Free" promotion, beginning with "Groovy Train" by The Farm. The "Double Q" moniker was meant to remind listeners of WROQ (whose call letters were transferred to WCKN in Anderson, South Carolina). The "Double Q" format was more of a mix of Top 40 and alternative rock music, which was starting to become popular during this time. In March 1993, AT&T would acquire the stations temporarily due to Adams' bankruptcy while a permanent owner was being sought. Pyramid Broadcasting, then-owners of WRFX, would buy the stations in September.

On January 15, 1994, after a one-day stunt with a 10 kHz tone, the station rebranded as "95.1 The Edge", with new WEDJ call letters implemented on February 14. The station was initially a broad-based mainstream Top 40, which shifted towards a modern rock lean by the Summer of 1995. However, this backfired, as competition from WEND (which aired a straightforward modern rock format) forced WEDJ to shift back to a mainstream direction by January 1996. In July 1995, Pyramid would merge with Evergreen Media (its AM sister station, by then WAQS, would be sold to SFX Broadcasting).

On May 31, 1996, after a brief stunt, WEDJ relaunched as "Kiss 95.1", becoming the second station in Charlotte to use the "Kiss" moniker, the first being WCKZ, which is now current sister WBAV. The first song on the relaunched "Kiss" was "I Go Blind" by Hootie & the Blowfish. The following day, WEDJ changed call letters to the current WNKS to match the "Kiss" moniker. In December 1996, WNKS (as well as Evergreen's 4 other Charlotte stations) was traded to EZ Communications (owners of WSOC-FM and WSSS; WRFX-FM would go to SFX Broadcasting), with Evergreen receiving EZ Communications' Philadelphia stations WIOQ and WUSL in return EZ would then be bought by American Radio Systems in July, which would reunite WNKS with its long-time AM sister station (by this point WRFX-AM, now WFNZ; WFNZ would be sold to Entercom in November 2016). ARS would be bought out by Infinity Broadcasting on September 19, 1997, with Infinity changing its name to CBS Radio in December 2005 as part of the spin-off of CBS' motion picture and cable television assets under a relaunched Viacom.

WNKS formerly served as the flagship for the syndicated Ace & TJ Show, which ran on the station from its debut on April 6, 1998 until May 20, 2011, when the duo left for WHQC due to a contract dispute. Ace & TJ will now return to the station in the mid-morning timeslot after the current morning show Maney and LauRen, which loses an hour as a result. They were replaced by afternoon host Otis. In March 2012, Otis moved back to afternoons, and Drex & Maney, formerly of WHBQ-FM in Memphis, officially took over morning drive. Cassiday Proctor would join a month later from KAMX in Austin. On January 5, 2015, Drex and Cassiday announced they would be leaving the station for a morning show position at WSTR in Atlanta. Maney remained at WNKS, and was joined by new co-hosts LauRen (formerly of WZGV) and Roy (formerly of WXLK) the following month.

On October 2, 2014, CBS Radio announced that it would trade all of their Tampa and Charlotte stations (including WNKS), as well as WIP in Philadelphia to the Beasley Broadcast Group in exchange for 5 stations located in Miami and Philadelphia. The swap was completed on December 1, 2014.

On July 13, 2022, it was reported that The Ace & TJ Show, would return to WNKS on July 18.

The Kiss logo
WNKS uses the same logo as WXKS-FM ("Kiss 108"), a Top-40 station owned by iHeartMedia and based in Boston, Massachusetts. This dates back to when both stations were owned by Pyramid Broadcasting, and later Evergreen Media.

Kiss 95.1 in National Media 
Kiss 95.1 entered national spotlight when the morning show hosts Maney, Roy & LauRen became recurring cast members of TLC's My Big Fat Fabulous Life.

References

External links
Kiss 95.1 Website
History of the station

NKS
Contemporary hit radio stations in the United States
Radio stations established in 1966
NKS